Golden pomfret may refer to:

 Trachinotus blochii, an edible pompano fish
 Xenobrama microlepis, a rare pomfret from the subantarctic Pacific Ocean

Animal common name disambiguation pages